The yellow-striped brushfinch (Atlapetes citrinellus) is a species of bird in the family Passerellidae.

It is found in the Andean foothills of northwestern Argentina. Its natural habitats are subtropical or tropical moist montane forest and subtropical or tropical high-altitude shrubland.

References

yellow-striped brush finch
Birds of the Southern Andean Yungas
Endemic birds of Argentina
yellow-striped brush finch
Taxonomy articles created by Polbot